Aagumchiidalix is an uninhabited island located in the Aleutian Islands chain in Alaska, near the community of Atka.

References

Uninhabited islands of Alaska
Islands of Unorganized Borough, Alaska
Islands of Alaska